Dutch studies may refer to:
 the academic study of Dutch culture and language (Neerlandistiek)
 Japanese Rangaku